The 2003 Scottish League Cup final was played on 16 March 2003 at Hampden Park in Glasgow and was the final of the 56th Scottish League Cup. The final was contested by Celtic and Rangers. Rangers won the match 2–1, thanks to goals from Claudio Caniggia and  Peter Løvenkrands. John Hartson missed a penalty kick late in the game that would potentially have taken the match into extra time.

Match details

2003
League Cup Final
Scottish League Cup Final 2003
Scottish League Cup Final 2003
2000s in Glasgow
Old Firm matches